Matthew Collin Lee Williams (born 28 June 1990) is a Zimbabwean former cricketer. He played four first-class cricket matches and three List A cricket matches in his career for Matabeleland Tuskers and Westerns.

Personal life 
His father, Collin Williams was a Zimbabwean first-class cricketer and a former field hockey coach and his mother, Patricia McKillop is a Zimbabwean woman field hockey player who was also a key member of the Zimbabwean field hockey team which claimed gold medal at the 1980 Summer Olympics. Matthew's step brother, Michael McKillop is a Zimbabwean field hockey player and served as the captain of the national field hockey team who also played first-class cricket for Matabeleland. His elder brother, Sean Williams, has played international cricket for Zimbabwe since 2005 and has captained the team since 2019.

References

External links 

1990 births
Living people
Zimbabwean cricketers
Matabeleland Tuskers cricketers
Westerns (Zimbabwe) cricketers
White Zimbabwean sportspeople
Cricketers from Bulawayo